Robert Matthew Snelling (born December 19, 2003) is an American professional baseball pitcher in the San Diego Padres organization.

Amateur career
Snelling attended Robert McQueen High School in Reno, Nevada, where he played on both the baseball team as a pitcher and on the football team as a linebacker and quarterback, the latter of which his father was head coach of. During the summer of 2021, he participated in the High School All-American Game as well as in the All-Star High School Home Run Derby at Coors Field where he hit 21 home runs. He was named Region Player of the Year following his senior football season. As a senior for the baseball team in 2022, he struck out 145 batters while also batting .450. He broke the state record for strikeouts in a game with twenty in a seven-inning game. He also set a new state single-season record for strikeouts. He finished the season 8-0 with a 0.56 ERA and 145 strikeouts alongside batting .362 with six home runs, and was named the Gatorade Nevada Baseball Player of the Year. Following the season's end, he traveled to San Diego where he participated in the Draft Combine.

Snelling originally committed to play college baseball for the Stanford Cardinal at the end of his freshman year of high school, but decommitted during his junior year after he began also getting recruited for football. He then committed to play both baseball and football for the Arizona Wildcats, but decommitted when baseball coach Jay Johnson left to coach the LSU Tigers. Snelling then committed to LSU to play baseball.

Professional career
Snelling was selected by the San Diego Padres with the 39th overall selection of the 2022 Major League Baseball draft. He signed with the team for $3 million.

References

External links

2003 births
Living people
Baseball players from Nevada
Baseball pitchers